The 2018 Omloop Het Nieuwsblad was a road cycling one-day race that took place on 24 February 2018 in Belgium. It was the 73rd edition of the Omloop Het Nieuwsblad and the fourth event of the 2018 UCI World Tour. It was won by Danish rider Michael Valgren for the  team, soloing to victory by 12 seconds ahead of 's Łukasz Wiśniowski of Poland, with the podium completed by the highest-placed home rider Sep Vanmarcke.

Teams
As the race was only added to the UCI World Tour calendar in 2017, all UCI WorldTeams were invited to the race, but not obligated to compete in the race. As such, seventeen of the eighteen WorldTeams – with the exception of the  – competed in the race, up two on 2017. Eight UCI Professional Continental teams competed, completing the 25-team peloton.

Result

References

External links
 

2018 UCI World Tour
2018 in Belgian sport
2018
February 2018 sports events in Belgium